Ivan Afanasyevich Dmitrevsky (February 28, 1734 in Yaroslavl – October 27, 1821 in Saint Petersburg) is generally regarded as the most influential actor of Russian Neoclassicism and "Russia's first great tragedian".

Together with his friend Fyodor Volkov he inaugurated the first Russian theatre in his native Yaroslavl (1750), later moving with the rest of the troupe to St Petersburg (1756). His tragic parts in Alexander Sumarokov's plays were admired by Catherine the Great and her friend Ekaterina Dashkova. Later, he delivered lectures on theatre in the Russian Academy, of which he was a member. In his writings and plays, Dmitrevsky emphasized reason over emotions, propagating "the loud, artificial declamatory acting style" of French Neoclassicism.

Stage actress and singer Agrafena Musina-Pushkina (1740–1782/86) studied with him, and later became his wife.

References

Members of the Russian Academy
Russian male stage actors
1734 births
1821 deaths
18th-century male actors from the Russian Empire
Dramatists and playwrights from the Russian Empire
Burials at Tikhvin Cemetery
People from Yaroslavl